Packwood is a medieval settlement and former civil parish of 1760 acres, now in the counties of the West Midlands and Warwickshire, England. In 1194 the ownership of Packwood estate was disputed between the Bishop of Coventry and the Prior of Coventry. In 1951 the parish had a population of 990. The small rural area includes the Grade I listed sixteenth century National Trust property Packwood House, the separate Packwood Hall (Grade II listed) and its adjacent church of St Giles.

St Giles Church
St Giles is a Grade II* listed building church alongside Packwood Hall. The nave and chancel date from the thirteenth century and the tower around 1500. The north transept was added around 1704. The church contains memorials to the Featherston family of Packwood Hall. The tower was financed by Nicholas Brome, lord of the manor of nearby Baddesley Clinton, in atonement for killing the local priest who was attacking his wife.

History 
On 1 April 1932 the parish was abolished and became part of Lapworth and Solihull Urban.

References

Villages in the West Midlands (county)
Villages in Warwickshire
Former civil parishes in the West Midlands (county)
Former civil parishes in Warwickshire
Solihull
Warwick District